S. R. Balasubramoniyan is an Indian politician from the state of Tamil Nadu and belongs to the AIADMK.

He joined congress party with influence of Kamaraj and followed way with GK. Moopanar. He was elected from Palladam constituency two times, 1989-1991 and 1991–1996. He served as leader of opposition in Tamil Nadu legislative assembly from 1991 to 1996. He was elected to Loksabha from Nilgiris from 1996 to 1998 and became the union minister for personal, public, governance, and parliamentary affairs in 1996–1997.

He was again elected as INC MLA from Thondamuthur constituency from 2001 to 2006.

June 2016, he was announced as the party's candidate for the Rajya Sabha biennial polls. On 3 June 2016, he was elected unopposed along with three others of his party.

References

Living people
Rajya Sabha members from Tamil Nadu
All India Anna Dravida Munnetra Kazhagam politicians
Year of birth missing (living people)